"Angel" is a single released by Yoko Ono on August 26, 2014 through Mind Train / Twisted. It reached number one on Billboards Hot Dance Club Play chart.

Track listing
Remixes Part 1
"Angel (Dank Club mix)" – 5:03
"Angel (Dank Trap mix)" – 4:04
"Angel (Soul Cartel Club mix)" – 6:02
"Angel (Soul Cartel Dub mix)" – 6:02
"Angel (Dave Aude Radio edit)" – 3:35
"Angel (Dave Aude Club mix)" – 5:45
"Angel (Dave Aude Dub mix)" – 5:05
"Angel (Dave Aude Instrumental)" – 5:45
"Angel (Mike Cruz Club mix)" – 6:54
"Angel (Mike Cruz Dub mix)" – 6:54

Remixes Part 2
"Angel (Rosabel Club mix)" – 7:52
"Angel (Rosabel Vocal Dub)" – 7:36
"Angel (Rosabel Dub mix)" – 7:35
"Angel (Emjae Club mix)" – 4:07
"Angel (DJLW Club mix)" – 4:13
"Angel (DJLW Instrumental)" – 3:26

Remixes Part 3
"Angel (Superchumbo Club mix)" – 6:16
"Angel (Superchumbo Dub mix)" – 7:02
"Angel (Fagault & Marina Club)" – 5:24
"Angel (Fagault & Marina Instrumental)" – 5:24
"Angel (The Carry Nation Everything mix)" – 7:14
"Angel (The Carry Nation Piano Dub)" – 6:30
"Angel (Bordertown Club mix)" – 4:12
"Angel (Bordertown Dub mix)" – 4:12
"Angel (JamLimmat and Miguel Picasso In Heaven Mix)" – 6:50
"Angel (JamLimmat and Miguel Picasso In Heaven Instrumental)" – 6:50

Charts

References

2014 singles
Yoko Ono songs
Songs written by Yoko Ono
Song recordings produced by Yoko Ono
2014 songs